Veaugues is a commune in the Cher department in the Centre-Val de Loire region of France.

Geography
The commune is one of 14 that grow grapes for the production of Sancerre AOC wine.

Population

Sights
 The church of St. Aignan, dating from the twelfth century.
 The feudal motte.
 A watermill.

See also
Communes of the Cher department

References

Communes of Cher (department)